Coleophora uniphalli is a moth of the family Coleophoridae. It is found in the lower Volga area in southern Russia.

The larvae feed on Salsola tragus.

References

uniphalli
Moths of Europe
Moths described in 2005